Alfrēds Ruks (10 November 1890 – 30 November 1941) was a Latvian middle-distance runner. He competed in the men's 1500 metres at the 1912 Summer Olympics, representing the Russian Empire and the men's 10 kilometres walk at the 1924 Summer Olympics, representing Latvia.

He was executed in a Soviet prison camp during World War II.

References

External links
 

1890 births
1941 deaths
Athletes (track and field) at the 1912 Summer Olympics
Athletes (track and field) at the 1924 Summer Olympics
Latvian male middle-distance runners
Latvian male racewalkers
Olympic competitors for the Russian Empire
Olympic athletes of Latvia
Place of birth missing
Executed Latvian people
Latvian people executed by the Soviet Union
Civilians killed in World War II
People who died in the Gulag
People from Sigulda